Alexander Kamp Egested (born 14 December 1993) is a Danish cyclist, who currently rides for UCI ProTeam . In October 2020, he was named in the startlist for the 2020 Vuelta a España.

Major results

2010
 7th Overall Trofeo Karlsberg
2011
 1st  Overall Driedaagse van Axel
 4th Overall Trofeo Karlsberg
2013
 1st Grand Prix de la ville de Nogent-sur-Oise
 2nd Road race, National Under-23 Road Championships
2015
 1st Skive–Løbet
 1st GP Horsens
 2nd Fyen Rundt
 3rd Road race, National Road Championships
 5th Road race, UCI Under-23 Road World Championships
 6th Dwars door Drenthe
 7th Hadeland GP
 7th Ringerike GP
 8th Overall Flèche du Sud
 9th Overall Danmark Rundt
2016
 1st  Road race, National Road Championships
 1st GP Horsens
 7th Overall Danmark Rundt
2017
 1st  Overall Tour du Loir-et-Cher
1st  Points classification
1st Stage 4
 1st Stage 3 International Tour of Rhodes
 3rd Road race, National Road Championships
 5th GP Viborg
2018
 1st Sundvolden GP
 1st Lillehammer GP
 2nd Overall Tour of Norway
1st Stage 5
 2nd Ringerike GP
 6th Overall Tour du Loir-et-Cher
 6th GP Horsens
2019
 1st  Overall Circuit des Ardennes
1st Stage 2
 1st  Points classification, Settimana Internazionale di Coppi e Bartali
 4th Overall Tour de Yorkshire
1st Stage 3
 8th Brabantse Pijl
2022
 1st  Road race, National Road Championships
 3rd Bretagne Classic
 5th Amstel Gold Race

Grand Tour general classification results timeline

References

External links

1993 births
Living people
Danish male cyclists
Cyclists from Copenhagen